David Rudolph may refer to:

 David D. Rudolph (born 1949), American politician from Maryland
 David J. Rudolph (born 1967), American scholar